Mikhail Kizeyev may refer to:

Mikhail Kizeyev (politician) (born 1978), Russian politician
Mikhail Kizeyev (footballer) (born 1997),  Russian footballer